Frank Preston LeMaster (born March 12, 1952) is a former professional American football linebacker in the National Football League who played for the Philadelphia Eagles from 1974 through 1982.  At 6'1", 195-lb., LeMaster was drafted by the Eagles from the University of Kentucky in the fourth round of the 1974 NFL Draft. He was selected to his one and only Pro Bowl in 1981.

1952 births
Living people
American football linebackers
Kentucky Wildcats football players
Philadelphia Eagles players
National Conference Pro Bowl players
Players of American football from Lexington, Kentucky